Erika Yamasaki (born 2 September 1987) is an Australian weightlifter. The daughter of Minoru Yamasaki and Ann Alvisio, she started Weightlifting in 2000, when she was tested in a talent identification program, along with her brother John Yamasaki. Erika first started to represent Australia in 2003 at the Oceania Championships, Niue Island. She has now competed at several international events, including Oceania Championships, World Championships, World Cup, Commonwealth Championships, Pacific and Commonwealth Games.

She represented Australia at the 2020 Summer Olympics in Tokyo, Japan. She finished in 12th place in the women's 59 kg event.

Career 

Erika Yamasaki won a bronze medal at the 2006 Commonwealth Games in the women's 48 kilogram event by snatching 69 kilograms, and clean and jerking 87 kilograms.

After the 2006 Commonwealth Games she had an operation to remove a labral tear in her hip joint which she obtained late 2005 whilst training.

At the 2010 Commonwealth Games she competed in the 48 kilogram event, snatching 73 kilograms, which was an Oceania record, but unfortunately was injured during the warm up for the clean and jerk, tearing the internal ligament in her elbow, and was not able to secure a clean and jerk result.

Prior to weight class and age group changes Yamasaki held 23 Queensland, 15 Australian records and 1 Oceania record, including events in the under 16, under 18 and open categories from weight classes from the 40 kg division to the 58 kg divisions inclusive.

Yamasaki is the first and only female to clean and jerk double body weight in Australia. At the 2015 National Championships she successfully lifted 106 kg in the 53 kg division.

International record
2003
Oceania & South Pacific Junior Championships - Niue

2004
Oceania Senior & Junior Championships - Suva, Fiji
World Junior Championships - Minsk, Belarus
Mermet Cup (AUS vs. USA) - Melbourne, Australia
Commonwealth Youth Games - Bendigo, Australia

2005
Australian Youth Olympic Festival - Sydney, Australia
World Junior Championships - Busan, South Korea
Mermet Cup International - Louisiana, USA
Commonwealth, Oceania & South Pacific Championships - Melbourne, Australia

2006
Melbourne Commonwealth Games - Melbourne, Australia
World Junior Championships - Hangzhou, China

2007
Arafura Games - Darwin, Australia
World Junior Championships - Prague, Czech Republic
IWF World Cup - Apia, Samoa

2010
Delhi Commonwealth Games - New Delhi, India

2011
Arafura Games & Oceania Championships - Darwin, Australia

2014
Glasgow Commonwealth Games - Glasgow, Scotland
World Senior Championships - Kazakhstan

2015
Arnold Invitational - Melbourne, Australia
Pacific Games & Oceania Senior Championships - Port Moresby, Papua New Guinea
World Senior Championships - Houston, Texas

2016
Oceania Senior Championships - Suva, Fiji
Commonwealth Championships - Penang, Malaysia

2016
Commonwealth & Oceania Championships - Gold Coast, Australia
Commonwealth Championships - Penang, Malaysia

2016
Arafura Games - Darwin, Australia

Personal bests

References

External links
 

1987 births
Living people
Australian people of Japanese descent
People from Darwin, Northern Territory
Weightlifters at the 2006 Commonwealth Games
Weightlifters at the 2010 Commonwealth Games
Weightlifters at the 2014 Commonwealth Games
Commonwealth Games bronze medallists for Australia
Sportswomen from the Northern Territory
Australian female weightlifters
Olympic weightlifters of Australia
Commonwealth Games medallists in weightlifting
Weightlifters at the 2020 Summer Olympics
Medallists at the 2006 Commonwealth Games